ASIP may refer to:
 Advanced Special Improvement Program models of US military SINCGARS radio family.
 Agouti signalling peptide
 Always Sunny in Philadelphia
 American Society for Investigative Pathology
 Application-specific instruction set processor

See also
 ACIP (disambiguation)